Camillo Mussi (18 November 1911 – 17 August 1940) was an Italian ice hockey player. He competed in the men's tournament at the 1936 Winter Olympics. He was killed during World War II after the plane he was piloting was shot down in Egypt.

References

External links
 

1911 births
1940 deaths
Olympic ice hockey players of Italy
Ice hockey players at the 1936 Winter Olympics
Ice hockey people from Milan
Regia Aeronautica personnel of World War II
Italian military personnel killed in World War II
Italian World War II pilots